Martin Tanga Jensen (born 19 January 1976) is a former Danish cricketer. Jensen was a right-handed batsman who bowled right-arm medium pace. He was born at Glostrup, Copenhagen County.

Jensen represented Denmark under-19s in the 1995 International Youth Tournament, making three appearances against Ireland under-19s, Scotland under-19s and the Netherlands under-19s. His senior debut for Denmark came in the 2000 ICC Emerging Nations Tournament, with him making his List A debut in the tournament against Ireland. Ireland won the toss and elected to bat first, making 217/8 from their 50 overs, with Jensen taking figures of 3/27 from 8 overs. Denmark successfully chased their target, winning by 5 wickets, with Jensen not required to bat. He made a further List A appearance in the tournament against Kenya. Kenya won the toss and elected to put Denmark into bat, with Denmark being dismissed for just 85, with Jensen ending the innings not out on 18, which was the highest score of the innings. Kenya successfully chased their target to win by 8 wickets, with Jensen taking one of the wickets to fall, that of Ravindu Shah. These were his final appearances for Denmark.

References

External links
Martin Jensen at ESPNcricinfo
Martin Jensen at CricketArchive

1976 births
Living people
People from Glostrup Municipality
Danish cricketers
Sportspeople from the Capital Region of Denmark